Vine ~ Bark & Spore (2000) is a collaborative album by ambient musicians Steve Roach and Jorge Reyes.

Track listing
”Clearing Place” (2:38)
”Sorcerer’s Temple” (5:21)
”The Holy Dirt” (13:43)
”Night Journey” (13:38)
”Spore and Bark” (11:21)
”Healing Temple” (5:50)
”Gone from Here” (19:27)

References

2000 albums
Steve Roach (musician) albums
Collaborative albums